SAS Assegaai, formerly known as SAS Johanna van der Merwe, was a  of the South African Navy. Decommissioned in 2003, SAS Assegaai is the only one of the former three Daphné-class submarines to have been retained for preservation as a museum boat, the other two have been cut up and sold for scrap. The Daphné-class submarines have since been replaced by the Type 209, or s.

Daphné-class submarines 

On 10 February 1967, after nearly two years of negotiations, an order was placed with the French Government to provide three Daphné (Dolphin)-class submarines in addition to providing the training and infrastructure to run and maintain them. The first of these submarines, was launched on 18 March 1969 - the date accepted as being the birth of the SAN's submarine service.
In 1999 the three boats were renamed ,  and SAS Assegaai respectively. In 2003, SAS Spear was cut up for scrap, followed by SAS Umkhonto in 2008 while SAS Assegaai is being preserved as a museum exhibit.

History

Laid down at the Dubigeon-Normandie shipyard in Nantes on 24 April 1969, she was the launched on 21 July 1970. Commissioned under command of Lt Cdr Theo Honiball on 21 August 1971, she completed her workup training in the Mediterranean, operating out of Toulon, before sailing for home on 4 May 1972. During the long passage, she was escorted by the frigate , and called at Cadiz, São Vicente, Luanda and Walvis Bay, before arriving in Simon's Town on 19 June 1972. Her arrival in South Africa marked the successful culmination of five years of construction, trials and training to establish South Africa's first ever submarine capability. It was not long before the submarines were involved in operations, and in 1975, just before Operation Savannah (Angola), SAS Johanna van der Merwe was deployed into Angolan waters under Operation Yskas to prepare for the evacuation of SA military personnel. During the South African Border War, she took part in some ten clandestine special operations.

During her career, she underwent four refits, which included installing additional fuel tanks, and the fitting of a locally developed RAKA combat suite in the 1980s, which replaced a cumbersome plotting table. In the late 1990s she received the South African developed NICKLES fully integrated software based combat suite and two state of the art rebuilt periscopes. With the acquisition of the new Type 209 submarines for the SA Navy, SAS Assegaai was paid off on 23 November 2003.

Museum boat 

SAS Assegaai has been converted into a museum ship and is stationed in Simon's Town.  A project that has been spearheaded by the South African Naval Heritage Trust, SAS Assegaai is a part of the South African Naval Museum.

References

External links 

South African Navy submarines
Daphne-class submarines
Submarines at defenceweb.co.za
Shipspotting
Naval Heritage Trust
 Submarine museum page

Submarines of the South African Navy
Ships built in France
1970 ships
Daphné-class submarines of the South African Navy
Museum ships in South Africa